Kajakarahu is an Estonian island in Eeslaht, Haapsalu, Lääne County. The length of the Kajakarahu coastline is 739 meters.
Kajakarahu is located 500 meters south of Uus Sadama, a street. 

Kajakarahu belongs to the Väinameri Conservation Area and is under nature protection.

See also
Kajakarahud
List of islands of Estonia

Islands of Estonia
Haapsalu